The Blue Lagoon is a 1980 American dramatic coming-of-age romantic survival film directed by Randal Kleiser from a screenplay written by Douglas Day Stewart based on the 1908 novel of the same name by Henry De Vere Stacpoole. The film stars Brooke Shields and Christopher Atkins. The music score was composed by Basil Poledouris and the cinematography was by Néstor Almendros.

The film tells the story of two young children marooned on a tropical island paradise in the South Pacific. But without either the guidance or the restrictions of society, emotional and physical changes arise as they reach puberty, go skinny dipping in the ocean and fall in love.

The Blue Lagoon was theatrically released on June 20, 1980, by Columbia Pictures. The film was panned by the critics, who disparaged its screenplay, execution, and Shields' performance, but Almendros' cinematography received praise. In spite of the criticism, the film was a commercial success, grossing over $58 million on a $4.5 million budget and becoming the ninth-highest-grossing film of 1980 in North America. The film was nominated for the Saturn Award for Best Fantasy Film, Almendros received a nomination for the Academy Award for Best Cinematography, and Atkins was nominated for the Golden Globe Award for New Star of the Year – Actor. Shields won the inaugural Golden Raspberry Award for Worst Actress for her work in the film.

Plot 

In the late Victorian period, two cousins, nine-year-old Richard and seven-year-old Emmeline Lestrange, and galley cook Paddy Button, are shipwrecked on a lush tropical island in the South Pacific. Paddy cares for the children and forbids them "by law" from going to the other side of the island, where he had found an altar with bloody remains from human sacrifices. He also warns them against eating the deadly scarlet berries. He dies after a drunken binge and the children rebuild their home on a different part of the island.

At puberty, they go skinny dipping in the ocean. Emmeline is uncomfortable with her sexual attraction to Richard and declines to share her "funny" thoughts with him. She is frightened by her first menstrual period and refuses to allow Richard to inspect her for what he imagines is a wound.

Eventually, Richard recognizes his own attraction to Emmeline. She ventures to the forbidden side of the island and sees the altar. Associating the blood with Christ's crucifixion, she concludes that the altar is God and tries to persuade Richard to go to the other side of the island to pray with her. Richard is shocked at the idea of breaking the law and they argue. When Richard tries to initiate sexual contact she rebuffs him; he hides and masturbates.

When a ship appears for the first time in years, Emmeline does not light the signal fire and asserts to Richard's angry disbelief that the island is their home now. She says she knows about Richard's masturbation and threatens to tell her Uncle Arthur about it. They fight and Richard kicks Emmeline out of their shelter.

Emmeline steps on a venomous stonefish. Weak from the poison, she pleads with Richard to "take [her] to God". Richard carries her across the island and places her on the altar. Emmeline recovers and they swim naked in the lagoon. Noticing their bodies' reactions, they discover sexual intercourse and become lovers. Neither  recognize the fact when Emmeline becomes pregnant and they are stunned to feel the baby move inside her abdomen, assuming her stomach is causing the movements.

Months later, Richard observes indigenous people performing a human sacrifice in front of the statue. He runs in fear to Emmeline, whom he finds in labor. They name their baby boy Paddy.

A ship led by Richard's father, Arthur, approaches the island and sees the family playing on the shore. Content with their lives, Richard and Emmeline walk away instead of signaling for help. Arthur assumes the mud-covered couple are not Richard and Emmeline.

Visiting their original homesite, Richard searches for bananas while Paddy, unnoticed, brings a branch of the scarlet berries into the boat with Emmeline. Paddy tosses an oar out of the boat as it drifts from the shore. Richard swims after them followed closely by a shark. Emmeline throws the other oar at the shark, striking it and giving Richard time to get into the boat. The boat drifts oarless out to sea.

After drifting for days, Richard and Emmeline wake up to find Paddy eating the scarlet berries. Hopeless, Richard and Emmeline eat the berries as well, and lie down to await death. Some hours later, Arthur's ship finds them. Arthur asks, "Are they dead?" The officer assures him, "No, sir. They're asleep".

Cast 
 Brooke Shields as Emmeline Lestrange
 Elva Josephson as Young Emmeline
 Christopher Atkins as Richard Lestrange
 Glenn Kohan as Young Richard
 Bradley Pryce as Little Paddy Lestrange
 Chad Timmermans as Infant Paddy
 Leo McKern as Paddy Button
 William Daniels as Arthur Lestrange
 Alan Hopgood as Captain
 Gus Mercurio as Officer

Casting
Brooke Shields was cast as Emmeline Lestrange based on her performance in Pretty Baby. Jodie Foster auditioned for the role of Emmeline Lestrange, but she was turned down. Kelly Preston also auditioned for the role. Diane Lane was offered the role but turned it down. Willie Aames was considered for the role of Richard Lestrange.

Production 

The film was a passion project of Randal Kleiser, who had long admired the original novel. He hired Douglas Day Stewart, who had written The Boy in the Plastic Bubble, to write the script and met up with Richard Franklin, the Australian director, who was looking for work in Hollywood. This gave him the idea to use an Australian crew, which Franklin helped supervise.

The film was shot at Nanuya Levu, a privately owned island in Fiji. The flora and fauna featured in the film includes an array of animals from multiple continents, including a species of iguana then unknown to Nanuya Levu. Herpetologist John Gibbons had just discovered said iguana on nearby Yadua Tabu, but word from an associate who had watched the film and spotted a strange lizard confirmed the existence of a second population. With credit to The Blue Lagoon, Gibbons described the Fiji crested iguana (Brachylophus vitiensis) in 1981. 

Shields was 14 years of age when she appeared in the film. All of her nude scenes were performed by the film's 32-year-old stunt coordinator, Kathy Troutt. Shields did many of her topless scenes with her hair glued to her breasts. Atkins was 18 when the movie was filmed, and he performed his own nude scenes (which included brief frontal nudity).

Underwater moving picture photography was performed by Ron Taylor and Valerie Taylor.

Reception

Critical response 
On Rotten Tomatoes the film holds an approval rating of 8% based on 25 reviews, with an average rating of 3.3/10. The website's critical consensus reads: "A piece of lovely dreck, The Blue Lagoon is a naughty fantasy that's also too chaste to be truly entertaining". On Metacritic, the film has a weighted average score of 31 out of 100, based on 14 critics, indicating "generally unfavorable reviews".

Among the more common criticisms were the ludicrously idyllic portrayal of how children would develop outside of civilized society, the unfulfilled buildup of the island's natives as a climactic threat and the way the film, while teasing a prurient appeal, conspicuously obscures all sexual activities. Roger Ebert gave the film 1½ stars out of 4, claiming that it "could conceivably have been made interesting, if any serious attempt had been made to explore what might really happen if two 7-year-old kids were shipwrecked on an island. But this isn't a realistic movie. It's a wildly idealized romance, in which the kids live in a hut that looks like a Club Med honeymoon cottage, while restless natives commit human sacrifice on the other side of the island". He also deemed the ending a blatant cop-out. He and Gene Siskel selected the film as one of their "dogs of the year" in a 1980 episode of Sneak Previews. Time Out commented that the film "was hyped as being about 'natural love'; but apart from 'doing it in the open air', there is nothing natural about two kids (unfettered by the bonds of society from their early years) subscribing to marriage and traditional role-playing". Gary Arnold of The Washington Post similarly called the film "a picturesque rhapsody to Learning Skills, Playing House, Going Swimming, Enjoying the Scenery and Starting to Feel Sexy in tropical seclusion". He particularly ridiculed the lead characters' persistent inability to make obvious inferences. One of the few positive reviews came from Variety which claimed it "a beautifully mounted production".

In a retrospective review for RogerEbert.com, critic Abbey Bender wrote: "When it comes to the depiction of burgeoning sexuality, The Blue Lagoon wants to have it both ways ... with puberty making itself known through rather obvious dialogue. Sexual discovery is here the natural outcome of the storybook situation. So yes, the soft-focus montages of teen flesh are gratuitous but the film presents it all as innocent—these kids don't even know what sex is! They don't even know how a baby is made! They learn it the hard way, obviously. By couching sexuality in primitive purity, The Blue Lagoon gets away with perversion that would likely be even more controversial today".

Box office 
The film was the twelfth-biggest box office hit of 1980 in North America according to The Numbers, grossing US$58,853,106 in the United States and Canada on a $4.5 million budget.

Accolades 

The film is recognized by American Film Institute in these lists:
 2002: AFI's 100 Years...100 Passions – Nominated

Versions and adaptations 
The Blue Lagoon was based on Henry De Vere Stacpoole's novel of the same name, which first appeared in 1908. The first film adaptation of the book was the British silent 1923 film of that name, which is now lost. There was another British adaptation in 1949.

The sequel Return to the Blue Lagoon (1991) loosely picked up where The Blue Lagoon left off, except that Richard and Emmeline are found dead in the boat. Their son is rescued.

A television adaptation of the novel by TV network Lifetime, Blue Lagoon: The Awakening, was released in 2012.

The 1982 Indian film Ina, directed by I. V. Sasi, is inspired by The Blue Lagoon and The Emerald Forest. The story is set in Indian state of Kerala and explores teen lust, child marriage and the consequences. 1984 Indian film Teri Baahon Mein and 1991 Hindi film Jaan Ki Kasam are also inspired by it.

Home media 
The Special Edition DVD, with both widescreen and fullscreen versions, was released on October 5, 1999. Its special features include the theatrical trailer, the original featurette, a personal photo album by Brooke Shields, audio commentary by Randal Kleiser and Christopher Atkins, and another commentary by Randal Kleiser, Douglas Day Stewart and Brooke Shields. The film was re-released in 2005 as part of a two-pack with its sequel, Return to the Blue Lagoon.

A limited edition Blu-ray Disc of the film was released on December 11, 2012, by Twilight Time. Special features on the Blu-ray include an isolated score track, original trailer, three original teasers, a behind the scenes featurette called An Adventure in Filmmaking: The Making of The Blue Lagoon, as well as audio commentary by Randal Kleiser, Douglas Day Stewart and Brooke Shields and a second commentary by Randal Kleiser and Christopher Atkins.

The 1980 movie was made available for streaming through services such as Amazon Video and Vudu.

See also 
 The Blue Lagoon (1923 version)
 The Blue Lagoon (1949 version)
 Return to the Blue Lagoon
 Blue Lagoon: The Awakening, a Lifetime television movie
 Paradise

References

External links 

 
 
 
 
 
 

1980 films
1980 romantic drama films
1980s adventure drama films
1980s coming-of-age drama films
1980s teen drama films
1980s teen romance films
American adventure drama films
American coming-of-age films
American remakes of British films
American romantic drama films
American survival films
American teen drama films
American teen romance films
Columbia Pictures films
Coming-of-age romance films
Films about castaways
Films about children
Films about cousins
Films about survivors of seafaring accidents or incidents
Films about virginity
Films based on British novels
Films based on romance novels
Films based on works by Henry De Vere Stacpoole
Films directed by Randal Kleiser
Films scored by Basil Poledouris
Films set in Oceania
Films set in the 19th century
Films set in the 1880s
Films set in 1889
Films set in the 1890s
Films set in 1895
Films set in 1897
Films set in the Victorian era
Films set on beaches
Films set on islands
Films set on uninhabited islands
Films shot in Fiji
Films with screenplays by Douglas Day Stewart
Golden Raspberry Award winning films
Incest in film
Juvenile sexuality in films
Teen adventure films
Teenage pregnancy in film
Films about puberty
1980s English-language films
1980s American films